Richard Wagner's works for the stage, representing more than 50 years of creative life, comprise his 13 completed operas and a similar number of failed or abandoned projects. His first effort, begun when he was 13, was a prose drama, Leubald, but thereafter all his works were conceived as some form of musical drama. It has been suggested that Wagner's wish to add incidental music to Leubald, in the manner of Beethoven's treatment of Goethe's drama Egmont, may have been the initial stimulus that directed him to musical composition.

Wagner's musical education began in 1828, and a year later he was producing his earliest compositions, writing words and music, since lost, for his first opera attempt, Die Laune des Verliebten. During the subsequent decade he began several more opera projects, none of which was successful although two were completed and one was staged professionally. His first commercial success came in 1842 with Rienzi, by which time he had completed Der fliegende Holländer, in which for the first time he used the device of the leitmotiv, a characteristic that became a feature of all his later works.

After accepting the post of Kapellmeister at the Dresden court of the King of Saxony in February 1843, Wagner continued to compose operas and plan various large-scale projects. His political activities forced him to flee the city in 1849, beginning a long period of exile. In Zurich, his first refuge, he wrote the essay Die Kunst und die Revolution ("Art and the Revolution"), in which he introduced the concept of Gesamtkunstwerk (total work of art), or "drama-through-music". This idea was developed in the extended discourse Oper und Drama ("Opera and Drama"), 1850–51. A different form of verse-setting, which Wagner termed Versmelodie, was proposed, in which the music would grow out of the verse, this unification overriding such traditional operatic considerations as display arias written as showcases for the talents of individual singers. According to Wagner historian Robert Gutman: "The orchestra with its many tongues would take over the traditional operatic tasks of the chorus". Beginning with Das Rheingold (1853–54), the principles of Gesamtkunstwerk became the basis of all Wagner's stage work, in which, quoting Wagner chronicler Charles Osborne, "the drama presented on a conscious level by the words [...] would be pursued on a deeper, unconscious level in the orchestra."

Librettist

From his first attempt in the opera genre, Die Laune des Verliebten, Wagner became his own librettist and remained so throughout his creative career. His practice was to create music and text simultaneously; in biographer Robert Gutman's words: "as the music proceeded it drew forth the words." While working on Tannhäuser Wagner explained his technique in a letter, saying: "before starting to create a verse or even outline a scene, I must first feel intoxicated by the musical aroma of my subject."

Cataloguing Wagner's works
Unlike the works of many composers, those of Richard Wagner were not identified by opus numbers, and no proper attempt to create a complete catalogue was made until the 1980s. In 1983 the Wagner scholar John Deathbridge, in an article in The Musical Times, outlined the need for a reliable catalogue. Two years later, in conjunction with Martin Gech and Egon Voss, he produced Wagner-Werk-Verzeichnis, described by fellow-scholar Michael Saffle as "perhaps the single finest and most useful of all Wagner reference works." Each of Wagner's known works, whether finished or unfinished, is listed in a number sequence running from 1 to 113. The list includes all compositions and all prose drafts where the music is either lost or unwritten.

List of works for the stage

 Sketched work or incomplete work

Translation:

See also
Bayreuth canon
List of compositions by Richard Wagner

Notes and references

List of sources

General
Bassett, Peter (2004): The Nibelung's Ring, Wakefield Press, Adelaide.  Retrieved on 25 March 2009
Borchmeyer, Dieter (2003): Drama and the World of Richard Wagner ed. Daphne Ellis. Princeton University Press, Princeton N.J.  Retrieved on 25 March 2009
Elschek, Oskár (ed.) (2003): A History of Slovak Music, Veda, Bratislava. 
Gutman, Robert W. (1971): Richard Wagner: The Man, His Mind and His Music, Penguin Books, London 
Kennedy, Michael and Joyce Bourne (2007): The Concise Oxford Dictionary of Music, OUP, Oxford, 
Millington, Barry (2001): (Wilhelm) Richard Wagner in Grove Music Online, ed. Laura Macy. Retrieved on 20 March 2009 
Millington, Barry (Spring 2005): After the Revolution: The Ring in the Light of Wagner's Dresden and Zurich Projects, University of Toronto Quarterly, University of Toronto, Toronto, Canada. Retrieved on 31 March 2009 
Osborne, Charles (1992): The Complete Operas of Wagner, Victor Gollancz, London, 
Pritchard, Jim (2007): Seen and Heard Opera Review: Wagner Rarities, MusicWeb International. Retrieved on 26 March 2009
Richard Wagner (1996) in Harvard Biographical Dictionary of Music. Harvard University Press, Cambridge, Massachusetts Retrieved on 24 March 2009
Saffle, Michael (2002): Richard Wagner: A Guide to Research, Taylor and Francis, London.  Retrieved on 25 March 2009 
Wagner Rarities (2007), MusicalCriticism.com. Retrieved 25 March 2009

Published scores
Die Feen: Piano and vocal score K Ferd. Heckel, Mannheim 1888. Retrieved on 5 April 2009
Das Liebesverbot: Piano and vocal score ed. Otto Singer. Breitkopf & Hartel, Leipzig 1922. Retrieved on 5 April 2009
Rienzi: Piano and vocal score ed. Gustav Kogel. Adolph Fürstner, Berlin 1910. Retrieved on 6 April 2009
Die fliegende Holländer: Piano and vocal score eds John Troutbeck and Theodore Baker. G. Schirmer, New York 1897. Retrieved on 6 April 2009
Tannhauser: Piano and vocal score (Dresden version) arr. Karl Klindworth. G. Schirmer, New York, 1895. Retrieved on 6 April 2009
Lohengrin: Piano and vocal score G. Schirmer, New York 1897. Retrieved on 6 April 2007
Das Rheingold: Piano and vocal score arr. Karl Klindworth. B. Schott's Söhne, Mainz 1908. Retrieved on 6 April 2009
Die Walküre: Piano and vocal score arr. Karl Klindworth. G Schirmer, New York (no date). Retrieved on 6 April 2009
Tristan und Isolde: Full orchestral and vocal score ed. Felix Mottl. C.F. Peters, Leipzig 1912. Retrieved on 6 April 2009
Die Meistersinger von Nürnberg: Piano and vocal score arr. Karl Klindworth. G. Schirmer, New York 1904. Retrieved on 6 April 2009
Siegfried: Piano and vocal score arr. Karl Klindworth. G. Schirmer, New York 1900. Retrieved on 6 April 2009
Götterdämmerung: Piano and vocal score arr. Karl Klindworth, G. Schirmer, New York 1900. Retrieved on 6 April 2009
Parsifal: Piano and vocal score arr. Karl Klindworth, G. Schirmer, New York 1904. Retrieved on 6 April 2009

Further reading
Deathridge J., Geck M. and Voss E. (1986). Wagner Werk-Verzeichnis (WWV): Verzeichnis der musikalischen Werke Richard Wagners und ihrer Quellen ("Catalogue of Wagner's Works: Catalogue of Musical Compositions by Richard Wagner and Their Sources"). Schott Musik International, Mainz, London, & New York.

External links
"Men are More Cunning than Women, or The Happy Bear Family": Review of October 2007 performance Arts Archive, 2007
Listing of the WWV 

 
Lists of operas by composer
Lists of compositions by composer